Ponte di Legno is an Italian comune of 1,729 inhabitants in Val Camonica, province of Brescia, in Lombardy.

Geography

Situated at the confluence of the two source rivers of the Oglio, Ponte di Legno is the uppermost comune of Valle Camonica.

History

The territory of the municipality of Ponte di Legno was part of the ancient Dalaunia (Dalegno), which included also the comune of Temù.

On September 27, 1917 the village was bombarded by Austrian cannons and razed to the ground in a short time.

Monuments and places of interest

Religious architectures
The churches of Ponte di Legno are:
 Parish of the Holy Trinity, dated 1685, though the wooden door is from 1929. Inside there are works from the workshop of Ramus.
 Church St. Appollonio  in Plampezzo. It is an ancient church dating from the twelfth century, with frescoes of the thirteenth century of the hand of the painter Johannes from Volpino.

Society

Demographic trends

Traditions and folklore
The scütüm are in camunian dialect nicknames, sometimes personal, elsewhere showing the characteristic features of a community.  The ones which characterize the people of the comune are:
 Poia: Bòrse
 Zoanno: Gòs
 Pezzo: Benui
 Precasaglio: Berlif

Twin towns
Ponte di Legno is twinned with:

  Recco, Italy

References

External links
 
 Historical photos - Intercam
 Historical photos - Lombardia Beni Culturali
 Ponte di Legno ski resort guide